In the Catholic Church, the vow of obedience is one of the three vows of professing to live according to the evangelical counsels. It forms part of the religious vows that are made both by members of the religious institutes and diocesan hermits.

Description
This is stipulated in
the candidate's respective Church law, for example in the Roman Catholic Church, the 1983 Code of Canon Law (see canons 573, 601, 603.2)
the candidate's respective rule, for example for those that are to be received into a Benedictine monastic community the Rule of St Benedict (ch. 58.17).

The 1983 Code of Canon Law (canon 601) defines it as follows:
"The evangelical counsel of obedience, undertaken in a spirit of faith and love in the following of Christ who was obedient even unto death requires a submission of the will to legitimate superiors, who stand in the place of God when they command according to the proper constitutions."

External links
Catholic Encyclopedia "Religious Obedience"

Catholic theology and doctrine
Christian terminology
Obedience
Hierarchy